Zamia pseudomonticola is a species of plant in the family Zamiaceae. It is found in Costa Rica (Puntarenas Province) and Panama (Chiriquí Province). Its natural habitat is subtropical or tropical moist montane forests. It is threatened by habitat loss.

References

pseudomonticola
Near threatened plants
Taxonomy articles created by Polbot